Lutiše is a village and municipality in Žilina District in the Žilina Region of northern Slovakia.

History
In historical records the village was first mentioned in 1662.

Geography
It has a population of about 818 people.

External links
https://web.archive.org/web/20070427022352/http://www.statistics.sk/mosmis/eng/run.html

Villages and municipalities in Žilina District